Zooming is a writing skill, as outlined in secondary education, that gives the reader the feeling of moving through space towards or away from a character or object, especially used in descriptive writing. It can be divided into two types: zooming in and zooming out. The idea of zooming finds an analog in the cinematic technique of the same name widely used in film.

Zooming in 
When zooming in, the narrator guides the reader in following a point of view. A conventional use of the technique might first create in the reader's mind a bird's eye view, or aerial shot, of the setting . The narrator might then delimit the reader's scope, before leading the reader to the object of focus. Since the introduction of the object is suspended, there might be a surprise ending.

Zooming out 
When zooming out, a single object might be the initial focus. The narrator then widens the view of the reader, and might eventually introduce the overview of the setting or fictional world.

References 

Descriptive technique